Cashion can refer to:

People
 Ann Cashion, American chef
 Ann K. Cashion, American nurse scientist
 Red Cashion (1931–2019), American football official

Places

United States
 Cashion, Arizona
 Cashion, Oklahoma
 Cashion Community, Texas